Whaling: British Columbia's Least Known and Most Romantic Industry is a silent black-and-white documentary film produced by Vancouver filmmaker A. D. Kean in the years 1916–1919. It is an early example of Canadian documentary filmmaking, and is the most complete of Kean's surviving productions. It is probably the earliest extant film to depict steam whaling on the west coast of North America.

Filming 

After starting his filmmaking career in 1913–14, Kean soon became involved in recording the various industries of British Columbia. In the fall of 1916, he obtained permission to film aboard vessels of the Victoria Whaling Company.

1916: Kean left Victoria, BC, in late September aboard the whaling tender Gray and traveled to the company's whaling station at Kyuquot, on the west coast of Vancouver Island. Here he filmed the arrival of dead whales, and the "flensing" and processing of the carcasses by Japanese workers. He later shipped out with Captain Willis Balcom aboard the whaler Black and filmed other whalers pursuing whales on the open sea. On the third morning out, Balcom successfully harpooned a whale that fought for three hours before expiring. The Black then towed its catch back to the station for processing.

1917: In April, Kean went out on the whaler William Grant from Sechart whaling station on Vancouver Island's west coast. From the brief published description, the footage shot appears to have covered the same subjects as those filmed in 1916. In July, he again sailed from Victoria on the Gray, which stopped at Kyuquot before proceeding to Rose Harbour whaling station on Kunghit Island in the Queen Charlotte Islands. The filming objective on this trip was mainly the sea lion colony off Cape St. James (at the southern tip of the Islands); he sailed there with Captain William Heater on the W. Grant.

1919: While sailing on BC's northern coast and Queen Charlotte Islands with Dr. C. R. Marlatt, Kean visited Rose Harbour again in August. He took his movie camera out in a whaler that hunted off Cape St. James.

Versions 
The 1916 version was first screened in early December at the Dominion Theatres in both Vancouver and Victoria. A newspaper ad for the Victoria screening bills the film as Whaling in Northern British Columbia and includes the tagline "Special Local Pictures Showing Victoria's Whalers at Sea". A screening at Vancouver's Broadway Theatre later in December advertised the film as "The Great Whale Hunt off the coast of Vancouver Island."

It seems likely that Kean re-edited his film in 1917 and 1919 to incorporate new and better footage as it became available.

Preservation status 
The surviving version, under the main title above, is preserved in the Ernest Belton collection at Library and Archives Canada (LAC) in Ottawa. The 35 mm master is 1131 feet in length and runs 16 minutes 45 seconds at presumed silent speed. It includes shots of the Rose Harbour whaling station, presumably shot in 1917 or 1919, along with footage and inter-titles matching the descriptions of the Vancouver Island footage in Kean's 1916 article "Whale Hunting." The film shows the preparation of harpoons and equipment, the search for whales, the pursuit, harpooning and killing of a whale, and all aspects of the processing of carcasses at the whaling station (the latter in graphic detail).The print's end title has an image of a variant British Columbia flag (the 1907 Canadian Red Ensign with an additional BC coat of arms at upper right), and superimposed text that reads "British Columbia Government Films". This would suggest that it represents the version circulated by the British Columbia Patriotic and Educational Picture Service, starting in 1920.

References

External links 
 Whaling: British Columbia's Least Known and Most Romantic Industry on Library and Archives Canada's YouTube channel.

1916 documentary films
1916 films
Canadian black-and-white films
Canadian documentary films
Canadian silent films
Films shot in British Columbia
Whaling in Canada
1910s Canadian films